The Classic of the Plough is a classical Chinese text written by Lu Kuei-Meng in ca. 880 AD. He describes the curved iron plough that had been introduced in the Tang Dynasty. His description would be used for ploughs in agricultural encyclopedias for several centuries. He describes each part of the plough and gives its dimensions with enough information for a replica plough to be constructed.

References

Plough
9th-century Chinese books
Ploughs